La Sarre is a town in northwestern Quebec, Canada, and is the most populous town and seat of the Abitibi-Ouest Regional County Municipality. It is located at the intersection of Routes 111 and 393, on the La Sarre River, a tributary of Lake Abitibi.

In addition to La Sarre itself, the town's territory also includes the community of Bienvenu, located along Route 111 west of the La Sarre River.

History

Before colonization, the area was home to the indigenous Algonquin who called the place Wabakin, from wàba and akin meaning "there is a mountain of hardwood", and called the La Sarre River Adikameg Sibi, which was also identified as Amikitik.

The first white settlers, six in number, settled as squatters on the land in the late 19th century and were discovered during the survey of the township in 1908. Real colonization began at the time when the National Transcontinental Railway running through the Abitibi region was completed. The first permanent pioneer family arrived in 1912, followed by more settlers and development drawn to the area for its mining, forestry, and agricultural potential, and resulted in the formation of the settlement. In 1915, the post office opened, and a year later, the La Sarre Township was proclaimed, named after the La Sarre Regiment that was recognized for its part in the Battle of Carillon and the capture of Fort Oswego. In 1917, the Township Municipality of La Sarre was established, the same year as the Parish of Saint-André-de-la-Sarre. The Hudson's Bay Company opened a post in 1932, and only operated until 1941.

In 1937, the village separated from the township and was incorporated as the Village Municipality of La Sarre. It gained town (ville) status on 17 August 1949. In April 1980, the town and township municipality merged to form the current municipality.

Demographics 

Economy 
The mining industry, together with small service sector businesses, complements the economy. The area's flying needs are served by La Sarre Airport.

Municipal council
 Mayor: Yves Dubé
 Councillors:  Sébastien Bélisle, Louis Côté, Steve Fontaine, Réjean Fournier, Richard Mailloux, Renée Thiboutot

List of mayors
Former mayors of La Sarre were:

 Adélard Cousineau 1917
 Félix Brousseau 1919
 Léonidas Boisvert 1920
 Hormidas Gauthier 1921–23
 Jules Lavigne 1923–31
 Edmond Mercier 1931–33
 Oscar Létourneau 1933–36
 Adrien Mercier 1936–39
 Gustave Rheault 1939–41
 Paul Bélanger 1941–44
 G. Eugène Lambert 1944–47
 Arthur Fortin 1947
 Fernand Doyon 1947–48
 Gérard Mercier 1948

 François-Xavier Martel 1948–51
 Gérard Mercier 1951–53
 Adélard Pelletier 1953–55
 Clément Déry 1955–63
 Hector Gagné 1963–68
 Roger Cousineau 1968–69
 Yves Baltazard 1969–72
 Raymond Thibault 1972–77
 Paul-Aurèle St-Pierre 1977–92
 Guy Carignan 1992–93
 Guillaume Marquis 1993–96
 J-Horace Lessard 1996–2003
 Normand Houde 2003–

Climate
La Sarre has a borderline humid continental climate (Köppen Dfb), close to a subarctic climate (Dfc). The hotter half of the year is pleasantly warm, though it can rain frequently.

See also
 List of cities in Quebec

References

External links
 Ville de La Sarre (French only)
 Vidéo : La Sarre en 1976
 Vidéo : La Sarre en 1989

Cities and towns in Quebec
Incorporated places in Abitibi-Témiscamingue
Hudson's Bay Company trading posts
Populated places established in 1912
1912 establishments in Quebec